Jukkal Assembly constituency is a SC reserved constituency of Telangana Legislative Assembly, India. It is one of 4 constituencies in Kamareddy district. It is part of Zahirabad Lok Sabha constituency.

Currently the constituency is held by Telangana Rashtra Samithi leader Hanmanth Shinde.

Mandals
The Assembly Constituency presently comprises the following Mandals:

Members of Legislative Assembly

Election results

Telangana Legislative Assembly election, 2018

Telangana Legislative Assembly election, 2014

See also
 List of constituencies of Telangana Legislative Assembly

References

Assembly constituencies of Telangana
Kamareddy district